Jill Lorie Hurst is an American television soap opera writer and producer.

Hurst is a native of Detroit. She studied theater at Wayne State University, then moved to New York City. For several years, she was a waitress during the day and would see Broadway shows in the evening.

She was initially hired at Guiding Light as a receptionist, and was then promoted to writer's assistant, eventually becoming part of the writing team and, in the last several years of the show, head writer.

Positions held
Guiding Light
Head writer (with David Kreizman, Lloyd Gold, Christopher Dunn): August 22, 2008 – 2009
 Story Producer: June 11, 2007 – August 21, 2008
 Associate head writer: 2001, August 15, 2006 – June 7, 2007
 Script writer: 1999 - 2001, 2002 – August 14, 2006
 Assistant to the writers: 1994–1999

Awards and nominations
Daytime Emmy Award
Win, 2007, Best Writing, Guiding Light
Nomination, 2005, Best Writing, Guiding Light
Nomination, 2003, Best Writing, Guiding Light
Nomination, 1999, Best Writing, Guiding Light

Writers Guild of America Award
Nomination, 2006, Best Writing, Guiding Light
Win, 2004, Best Writing, Guiding Light
Nomination, 2002, Best Writing, Guiding Light
Nomination, 2001, Best Writing, Guiding Light
Nomination, 1998, Best Writing, Guiding Light

References

External links

Year of birth missing (living people)
American soap opera writers
Living people
Wayne State University alumni
Writers Guild of America Award winners